Joseph Earlston Thropp (October 4, 1847 – July 27, 1927) was a Republican member of the U.S. House of Representatives from Pennsylvania.

Life
Joseph E. Thropp was born in Valley Forge, Pennsylvania.  He attended the public schools and Friends Central High School in Philadelphia, Pennsylvania.  He graduated as a civil engineer from the Polytechnic College of Pennsylvania in 1868.  He went to the Middle Northwest and engaged in his profession, constructing docks at Duluth, Minnesota, and Fond du Lac, Wisconsin, attaining the position of railroad division engineer.  In 1870 he moved to Conshohocken, Pennsylvania, and engaged in the manufacture of pig iron.  He subsequently became owner of the Earlston Furnaces in Everett, Pennsylvania, in 1888.

Thropp was elected as a Republican to the Fifty-sixth.  He was an unsuccessful candidate for reelection in 1900.  He retired from active business pursuits and resided in Washington, D.C., and Miami, Florida.  He died while on a visit in Quebec, Canada, in 1927.  Interment in West Laurel Hill Cemetery in Bala Cynwyd, Pennsylvania.

References

Sources

The Political Graveyard

External links

1847 births
1927 deaths
People from Chester County, Pennsylvania
Politicians from Philadelphia
American civil engineers
Burials at West Laurel Hill Cemetery
Republican Party members of the United States House of Representatives from Pennsylvania
Engineers from Pennsylvania